Damien Reid is a professional rugby league footballer who played as a  in the 2000s. He played at representative level for Scotland, and at club level for the Gateshead Thunder, Barrow Raiders, Castleford Tigers (Heritage № 821), Widnes Vikings, Sheffield Eagles and the Rochdale Hornets.

International honours
Damien Reid won a cap for Scotland while at Gateshead Thunder 2003 1-cap.

References

External links
Duo added to Castleford line-up
Championship round-up - week 17
Super League XI
Rugby League news for September > Tuesday 21 September
Statistics at rugby.widnes.tv

Living people
Barrow Raiders players
Castleford Tigers players
English people of Scottish descent
English rugby league players
Newcastle Thunder players
Rochdale Hornets players
Rugby league centres
Scotland national rugby league team players
Sheffield Eagles players
Widnes Vikings players
Year of birth missing (living people)
Place of birth missing (living people)